Emil Gabriel Warburg (9 March 1846 – 28 July 1931) was a German physicist who during his career was professor of physics at the Universities of Strassburg, Freiburg and Berlin. He was president of the Deutsche Physikalische Gesellschaft 1899–1905. His name is notably associated with the Warburg element of electrochemistry.  

Among his students were James Franck (Nobel Prize in Physics, 1925), Eduard Grüneisen, Robert Pohl, Erich Regener and Hans von Euler-Chelpin (Nobel Prize in Chemistry, 1929). He carried out research in the areas of kinetic theory of gases, electrical conductivity, gas discharges, heat radiation, ferromagnetism and photochemistry. 

He was a member of the Warburg family, and the father of Otto Heinrich Warburg (Nobel Prize in Physiology, 1931). He was a friend of Albert Einstein.

See also
Magnetic refrigeration

References

External links
 

1846 births
1931 deaths
German military personnel of the Franco-Prussian War
20th-century German physicists
German Lutherans
Humboldt University of Berlin alumni
Academic staff of the Humboldt University of Berlin
Jewish physicists
Members of the Prussian Academy of Sciences
People from Altona, Hamburg
Academic staff of the University of Freiburg
Heidelberg University alumni
Academic staff of the University of Strasbourg
Emil Warburg
Converts to Protestantism from Judaism
Prussian Army personnel
19th-century German physicists
Military personnel from Hamburg